Sara Moretto (born 28 September 1980) is an Italian politician. She is a member of the Chamber of Deputies for Italia Viva, formerly of the Democratic Party.

See also 

 List of members of the Italian Chamber of Deputies, 2018–

References 

Living people
1980 births
Deputies of Legislature XVII of Italy
Deputies of Legislature XVIII of Italy
21st-century Italian women politicians
Ca' Foscari University of Venice alumni
Italia Viva politicians
Democratic Party (Italy) politicians
People from Portogruaro
Women members of the Chamber of Deputies (Italy)